Edward Denny Day was an Irish-Australian police magistrate famous for the Myall Creek Massacre and capturing the "Jewboys".

Early life 
He was born in Country Kerry, Ireland in 1801. In 1820 he joined the 46th Regiment. In 1833 he became a lieutenant in the 62nd Regiment. He served some time in India until 1834 when he resigned due to ill health

Duties of police magistrate 
In 1835 he arrived in Sydney to work as clerk to the Executive Council. He work in office for the Colonial Secretary Alexander Macleay. In January 1836 he become the magistrate for the Vale of Clywdd. In January 1837 he served as magistrate in Maitland. In June 1838 he organised mounted police to arrest the 11 of 12 men responsible for the Myall Creek Massacre In 1840 he organised the capture of bushranger Edward Davis. He arranged the capture of two other bushrangers Davidson and Smith. Between 1841 and 1842 he become the commissioner for the Court of Requests in Maitland mainly working on insolvement estates. In September he announced to the community that was replacing Captain Inness as superintendent of Sydney Police. On 1 January 1851 he was appointed the provincial inspector of police for the northern district of Sydney. In 1853 he was stipendiary magistrate in Port Macquarie. Between 1858 until his retirement in 1869 he served as magistrate in Maitland.

Personal life 
In 1836 he married Margaret the daughter of postmaster-general James Raymond. The couple has eleven children together. After capture Davis the residents of Scone presented him with a plate for his services. He was founding member of the Australian Immigration Association and was elected chairman of the Maitland branch On 16 February 1844 he laid the foundation stone for the new goal at East Maitland. In January 1846 he laid the foundation of a new hospital at Maitland. He was unsuccessful as businessmen and his estate was sequestrated in 1848. He died on 6 May 1876. He is buried at St Peter's Burial Ground, East Maitland. At St Peters Church, Maitland there is a stained glass window with inscription dating back to 1887 stating: "To the Glory of God and in memory of Edward Denny Day of the 62nd Regiment who fell asleep 6 May 1876”.

References

Irish Australian
Australian police officers
People from County Kerry
1801 births

1876 deaths